The Detroit Public School League (PSL) is a high school conference based in the city of Detroit, Michigan and is governed by Detroit Public Schools (DPS) Office of Athletics. The PSL is affiliated with the MHSAA.

Current members

Defunct high schools
 Detroit Crockett High School
 Detroit Chadsey High School
 Detroit Cooley High School
 Detroit City High School
 Detroit Finney High School
 Detroit Kettering High School
 Detroit Mackenzie High School
 Detroit Sidney D. Miller High School 
 Detroit Murray–Wright High School
 Detroit Northeastern High School
 Detroit Northern High School
 Detroit Redford High School
 Detroit Southwestern High School

Notes
 Detroit Douglass is all boys while Detroit International Academy is all girls
 Detroit Ben Carson and Detroit School of Arts do not field sports teams of their own; Ben Carson co-ops with Douglass (boys sports) and International Academy (girls sports) while Detroit School of Arts co-ops with West Side Academy
 Detroit Delta Prep and Detroit Edison Academy are charter schools not affiliated with Detroit Public Schools
 Detroit Edison Academy is an independent in football as they did not want to play Cass Tech

Sports

Boys

Girls

State Champions and Runnersup

References

External links
Michigan High School Athletic Association
Detroit Public Schools

Michigan high school sports conferences
High schools in Detroit
Sports competitions in Detroit